In motor racing, BTC Touring (BTC-T) was the set of new regulations for the British Touring Car Championship (BTCC) introduced in 2001 BTCC, after the demise of the Supertouring category.

The cars were based on standard bodyshells, but were allowed significant modifications to turn the car into a racecar and differentiate it from the Super Production class that would run alongside BTC Touring in the 2001 BTCC.

Models
In chronological order of their appearances, the cars were:

BTC-T Vauxhall Astra Coupe
BTC-T Peugeot 406 Coupe
BTC-T Alfa Romeo 147
BTC-T Lexus IS200
BTC-T MG ZS EX259
BTC-T Honda Civic Type-R
BTC-T Proton Impian
BTC-T Peugeot 307
BTC-T Vauxhall Vectra
BTC-T Vauxhall Astra Sport Hatch
BTC-T Honda Integra Type R

Gallery

History
A year after the regulations began, the European Touring Car Championship launched its Super 2000 regulations. As the latter allowed manufacturers to have their cars seen internationally, most major companies opted for this, meaning that the BTCC suffered from small grids. In 2004, TOCA allowed Super 2000 cars to compete, with rules designed to equalise the performance of both classes. BTC-T cars were eventually made ineligible to win the main championship from 2007.

The 2010 season was meant to be the last year BTC Touring cars would be eligible to enter the championship, however they were allowed to compete for one more season in 2011, with their base-weight +50 kg on 2010.

References 

Racing car classes
British Touring Car Championship